Azizi-ye Sofla (also Romanized as ‘Azīzī-ye Soflá; also known as ‘Azīzī-ye Pā’īn) is a village in Sarfaryab Rural District, Sarfaryab District, Charam County, Kohgiluyeh and Boyer-Ahmad Province, Iran. At the 2006 census, its population was 77, in 12 families.

References 

Populated places in Charam County